Pound Puppies is a toy line that was created by Tonka in the 1980s. It later inspired an animated TV special, two animated TV series, and a feature film. Shipments of the toys over five years generated sales of $300 million in 35 countries.

Toy description
The puppies were a variety of plush stuffed dog dolls with floppy ears and droopy eyes. They came in a variety of colors (gray, brown, white), some with spots. Each one came in a cardboard case shaped like a doghouse with an "adoption" certificate. The tagline was "Loveable Huggable". Smaller versions were also created (approximately 5 inches (13 cm) long), and a line of cats called Pound Pur-r-ries was also released. Each authentic toy puppy had a heart-shaped or a bone (on the very first edition puppies) emblem near its tail that sported a "PP" logo with either a dog (Puppies) or cat (Purries) peeking above it.

Toy history

North America

The toys were created by Mike Bowling in 1984. The first puppies were sold by Irwin Toy in Toronto, Canada. After Irwin, the line was produced by Tonka which introduced them to the U.S. market.

In 1987, Hardee's and Pizza Hut restaurants also offered a series of Pound Puppies with their Children's Meals. Other products besides stuffed toys were made such as Little Golden Books, coloring books and miniature figurines.

Pound Puppies continued to be popular in the early 1990s. The toys were produced again in the early 2000s and included specific breeds of dog (as opposed to a generic model) along with barking sounds and movements.

The toyline was discontinued in 2002; however, the 2010 series of the same name was produced by Hasbro Studios and aired on The Hub in 2010.

The toy line was relaunched in 2014 by Funrise and they are still available in stores today. In 2019, they were reintroduced again. This time, being sold by Basic Fun! in stores featuring normal sizes and baby sizes. They previously sold jumbo sizes as well.

Other regions
In South America in the 1980s the toys went by the name Snif Snif (an onomatopoeic brand). Makers under license included Brazil's Estrela, Argentina's Antex, and Peru's BASA. 

In France they were known as Les Pitous (individual dolls going simply by the singular Pitou). The toys were made by Vulli under license.

In Germany they were known as Wauzi (Pound Purries were also sold as Miauzi). 

In Italy they were known as Cercafamiglia, and were made by Harbert

In the United Kingdom Pound Puppies was distributed by Hornby Hobbies

TV special

A TV special based on the toyline was released in October 1985 by Hanna-Barbera. It ran in syndication, paired with Star Fairies. In the special, a female dog named Violet Vanderfeller is dognapped and ends up at the city pound. The Pound Puppies attempt to and end up succeeding in reuniting Violet with her family. The special was released in 1986 on VHS by Family Home Entertainment and is also available on DVD. The DVD comes with certain Pound Puppies toys.

TV series

1986 TV series

After the TV special became successful, Hanna-Barbera gained the rights to create an animated TV series. The series was broadcast on ABC from September 1986 to February 1989. While the series was loosely based on the special, it made no mention of the character Violet. The Pound Puppies who were featured also underwent re-designs from the TV special. When the program was renewed for a second season, there were major style differences and the series was retitled All New Pound Puppies.

Characters
See List of Pound Puppies characters

2010 TV series

Another television series, this time produced for Hasbro Studios, was premiered on the Hub Network (now Discovery Family; partly owned by Hasbro since its launch) on 10 October 2010, the channel's launch date. The characters are based on the current version of the Puppies which Hasbro released in the summer of 2012. In addition, there was an online website where one could download a Pound Puppies adoption certificate. On 9 July 2012, Pound Puppies was one of four original animated series from The Hub to win the CINE Golden Eagle Award for its high quality production and storytelling. In August 2012, the season one episode "I Never Barked for My Father" was awarded the Humanitas Prize for excellence in writing for children's television animation.

Feature film

In 1988, TriStar Pictures released a Pound Puppies movie titled Pound Puppies and the Legend of Big Paw. It was produced by Atlantic Releasing, Carolco, Family Home Entertainment and Kushner-Locke with The Maltese Companies.

It was panned by critics, and poorly received at the box office. Shoddy animation, character inconsistencies and a color palette that differed from the show's were among the chief complaints.

Fans were also confused by the apparent romantic pairing of Nose Marie and Cooler, which contradicted events that had taken place in the first season of the series. In addition, the plot is set in the 1950s with the story being narrated by Whopper, who in the present day is an older dog who tells the story to his nephew and niece.

References

External links
 Pound Puppies at Galoob (Archive)

 
1980s toys
Fictional dogs
Products introduced in 1985
Stuffed toys
Tonka brands
Toy animals